Alessandro Sozzini (1508 – April 1541, in Macerata) was an Italian humanist, son of Mariano Sozzini the younger, and the father of Fausto Sozzini.

References

1508 births
1541 deaths
Italian Renaissance humanists
Alessandro